Cyperus isabellinus is a species of sedge that is native to the north eastern Australia.

See also 
 List of Cyperus species

References 

isabellinus
Plants described in 1991
Flora of Queensland
Taxa named by Karen Louise Wilson